Allan Joseph Legere (born February 13, 1948), also known as the Monster of the Miramichi, is a Canadian rapist, arsonist, and serial killer.

Early life
Allan Joseph Legere was born in Chatham Head, New Brunswick.

First murder
On the evening of June 21, 1986, Legere and two accomplices, Todd Matchett and Scott Curtis robbed a convenience store in Black River Bridge, New Brunswick. After cutting the power, the trio broke into the  store where they were met with the owners, an elderly couple, John and Mary Glendenning. The couple was severely beaten and the latter was sexually assaulted. The trio then fled the scene. Mary Glendenning regained consciousness and discovered that her husband had been beaten to death; she crawled up the stairs to the phone and dialed 911. The dispatcher spoke with her on the phone until police arrived. Police tracked down the three and arrested them. Matchett pleaded guilty to murdering John Glendenning and brutally beating his wife; Curtis and Legere were convicted at trial.

Escape from hospital
Legere was serving his murder sentence at the Atlantic Institution maximum security penitentiary in Renous-Quarryville, under the responsibility of the Correctional Service of Canada (CSC). On May 3, 1989, Legere was transported by CSC personnel from the penitentiary to the Dr. Georges-L.-Dumont Regional Hospital in Moncton, New Brunswick, for the treatment of an ear infection. Legere managed to convince the CSC personnel to let him use a washroom at the hospital alone, and there he picked the lock on his handcuffs. He had concealed a sharpened piece of metal in his rectum, and was able to pick the lock on his handcuffs and held the officers at bay before fleeing the building. Legere escaped the hospital property and through a combination of carjacking and motor vehicle theft, was able to evade recapture.

More murders and eventual capture 
Legere was at large for a period of seven months and during this time committed four additional murders in and around the towns of Chatham, Newcastle, and adjoining communities (now part of the city of Miramichi). The individuals he murdered were Annie Flam (May 29, 1989; during this incident, Flam's sister was also assaulted); sisters Linda and Donna Daughney (October 13, 1989; Legere set fire to the Daughney home before leaving), and Father James Smith (November 16, 1989). Legere was recaptured on November 24, 1989, following a failed carjacking that began in Saint John and ended outside Rogersville; rewards of $50,000 were collected for the information that led to his arrest.

Trial and conviction
In August 1990, Legere was convicted on charges pertaining to his escape, and sentenced to an additional nine years. His trial for the murders began with an indictment in November of that year. Legere's trial featured the first Canadian uses of DNA profiling to convict rather than exonerate; in November 1991, Legere was convicted of the murders committed while he had been at large.

Present
In 2015, Legere was transferred from the super-maximum security penitentiary (the "SHU", in Sainte-Anne-des-Plaines, Quebec) to the Edmonton Institution in Alberta.

In 1996, the provincial jail in Fredericton was shut down, and in 1999 the building was repurposed into a science museum; the cell in which Legere was held during his 1991 trial is now used for an exhibit on DNA profiling.

In August 2020, Legere applied for day parole. Although the parole board notice does not guarantee he will be granted day parole, the request raised concerns in the Miramichi community.

Legere was scheduled for a parole hearing on January 13, 2021, where he was denied.

See also
List of serial killers by country

References

Further reading
 Raymond Fraser. "TODD MATCHETT: Confessions of a Young Criminal (The Story Behind Allan Legere and the Murder at Black River Bridge). New Ireland Press, 1994.

External links
NFB film, Allan Legere: The Monster of Miramichi
Allan Legere's long shadow, by David Adams Richards
 Crime Stories: The Monster of Miramichi, Documentary (1998) via crimedocumentary.com / runtime: 45 minutes.

1948 births
20th-century Canadian criminals
Canadian arsonists
Canadian escapees
Canadian male criminals
Canadian people convicted of murder
Canadian prisoners sentenced to life imprisonment
Canadian rapists
Canadian serial killers
Escapees from Canadian detention
Fugitives
Living people
Male serial killers
People convicted of murder by Canada
People from Miramichi, New Brunswick
Prisoners sentenced to life imprisonment by Canada